Nipissing First Nation is a long-standing community of Nishnaabeg peoples located along the shorelines of Lake Nipissing in northern Ontario. They are referred to by many names in European historical records, since the colonists often adopted names given to them by other nations.

The Nipissing are part of the Anishinaabe peoples, a grouping of people speaking Algonquin languages, which includes the Odawa, Ojibwe, Potawatomi, and Algonquins. This broad heritage is likely the result of the Nipissings' living at a geographical crossroads, a watershed divide.

Geography

Lake Nipissing drains via the French River into Georgian Bay and, to the east of Lake Nipissing, Trout Lake drains via the Mattawa River into the Ottawa River. Living at the crossroads between two watersheds, the Nipissing were key to trade to the east, west, north and south of Lake Nipissing. The French portaged the watershed divide extensively to reach the Great Lakes by canoe from their settlements around Montreal on the Saint Lawrence River.

To the west the Nipissing trade routes extended as far as Lake Nipigon and their Ojibwa neighbours, and to the north as far as James Bay, where they traded with the Cree and, later, the English. Their trade network to the east extended as far as present-day Quebec City, also on the Saint Lawrence. The Iroquoian-speaking Huron people lived nearby to the south. Archaeological evidence shows that the Nipissing integrated some Huron styles and techniques in their pottery.

They obtained food primarily through hunting, fishing, and gathering. Their extensive trading likely allowed them to supplement their diets with corn, beans and squash as well, which were staple crops cultivated by many First Nations peoples. The land in the lake valleys would have supported some horticulture.

Today Nipissing First Nation lies between the city of North Bay and the municipality of West Nipissing in northeastern Ontario. Most members of the First Nation reside on the First Nations reserve of Nipissing Indian Reserve 10.

History

The Nipissing controlled trade routes that became increasingly desirable during the early French colonial period, as the French proved a large, lucrative market for the inland pelts, exporting many to Europe. The Iroquois, based south of Lake Ontario, conducted military campaigns against the competing Huron and Nipissing in the competition for furs. By 1647, the Nipissing regrouped in the Lake Nipigon area. The Nipissing continued to use their historical trade routes but at greater risk. Claude-Jean Allouez visited the Nipissings at Lake Nipigon 1667, but in 1671 he reported that the Nipissing had returned to Lake Nipissing. After returning to Lake Nipissing, some of the Nipissings relocated to the missions at Trois-Rivières  and Oka, Quebec.

The noted 18th-century Cherokee chief, Attakullakulla (died 1775) was born a Nipissing. He was captured as a child when the Cherokee raided his community and killed his parents; he was adopted by a Cherokee family.

By the early 19th century, European colonists and Métis had started trapping in the area in and around Lake Nipissing, rather than relying on pelts brought to trading posts by First Nations peoples. This competition resulted in fewer pelts available to the Nipissing and other First Nations in the area.

In 1850 the Nipissing signed the Robinson Treaty with the Canadian representatives of the British Crown. In the face of increasing European encroachment by settlers, they wanted to confirm their claim to the north shores of Lake Nipissing and its main waterways.

Reserve
Nipissing 10, as it was formerly known, is an Indian reserve in northeastern Ontario located on the north shores of Lake Nipissing in the Nipissing District, serving as the land base for the Nipissing First Nation. The  reserve is located west of North Bay and east of West Nipissing.

The reserve comprises the communities of Beaucage, Jocko Point, Yellek, Duchesnay, and Garden Village, as well as many smaller sub-divisions. Garden Village is accessible by municipal streets in Sturgeon Falls. The other communities all have direct access off of Highway 17 West.

Society
Traditionally, the Nipissing nation is structured around families and clans (or doodems). The five doodems are: Blood (Miskwaa'aa, recorded as "Miskouaha"), Birchbark (Wiigwaas), Heron (Ashagi, recorded as "Outchougai"), Beaver (Amikwaa, recorded as "Amicois" or as "Nez Percés"), and Squirrel (Asanagoo). During the period of the clans' early contact with the Europeans, the Blood, Birchbark, and Squirrel clans were located on and about Lake Nipissing, the Heron clan resided primarily on Lake Nipissing but also on lands extending southward to the eastern coast of Lake Huron's Georgian Bay, and the Beaver clan was located on the northern coast of Georgian Bay, adjacent to Heron territory.

Each clan is subdivided along family lines. They govern independently but at the same time cooperatively, as part of Nipissing Nation as a whole. They respect a person's right to decide individual paths..

Demographics
As of February 2009, Nipissing First Nation had a total registered population of 2,201 people, of which 886 lived on their own reserve. The 2001 Canadian Census recorded 1,378 people lived on Nipissing 10 Indian Reserve.

According to the 2011 Canadian Census:
Population: 1,450
% Change (2006-2011): 2.6
Dwellings: 674
Area (km²): 61.22
Density (persons per km²): 23.7

Governance

The current governance of the Nipissing First Nation is elected under the custom electoral system, consisting of a chief, deputy chief and six councillors. The current council consists of Chief Scott McLeod and Deputy Chief Muriel Sawyer, along with Councillors June Commanda, Brian Couchie, Corey Goulais, Jane B Commanda, Michael Sawyer and Eric "Ric" Stevens. Their three-year term ends July 31, 2018.

The Nipissing First Nation's council is a member of Waabnoong Bemjiwang Association of First Nations, which is a regional chiefs' council. The First Nation is also a member of the Union of Ontario Indians, a tribal political organization representing many of the Anishinaabe First Nations in central and southern Ontario.

In January 2014, the Nipissing adopted what is believed to be the first constitution for First Nations in Ontario.  It is supposed to replace the Indian Act as the supreme law which regulates the governance of the First Nation, but has not been tested in court.

Notable Nipissing
Dan Frawley (ice hockey), b. 1962, NHL hockey player, captain of the Pittsburgh Penguins 1987
Ian Campeau of A Tribe Called Red 
Attakullakulla of Meskwaki tribe was adopted into the Cherokee Tribe and later served as a chief

See also
Anishinabek Educational Institute

References

External links
 
 Nipissing First Nation profile on the Aboriginal Affairs and Northern Development Canada website
 First Nation Detail

First Nations in Ontario
Algonquian ethnonyms
Anishinabek Nation
Anishinaabe reserves in Ontario
Communities in Nipissing District
Lake Nipissing